The Manhunter is an American crime drama that was part of CBS' lineup for the 1974–1975 television season. The series was produced by Quinn Martin and starred Ken Howard as Dave Barret, a 1930s-era private investigator from Idaho.

Synopsis
The series' premise has Dave going from his parents' farm in Idaho to other parts of the Western and North Central United States to solve crimes, after the death of his best friend during a bank robbery. Using a car which is well stocked with weapons, he hunts down men who were wanted by the law. The series also starred Hilary Thompson as Dave's sister Lizabeth Barret, Ford Rainey as his father, James, Claudia Bryar as his mother, Mary and Robert J. Hogan as Sheriff Paul Tate.

Among the series' guest stars were Michael Constantine, Joan Van Ark, Denver Pyle, Tom Skerritt, Leslie Nielsen, Sam Elliott, Dabney Coleman, Paul Carr, a pre-Star Wars Mark Hamill, Linda Marsh, Parley Baer, a pre-The Simpsons Jo Ann Harris and Barbara Rhoades.  Already known for his portrayal of Thomas Jefferson in 1776, Howard would later become famous playing the main character on The White Shadow.

The Manhunter pilot episode was shown on February 26, 1974. It was then picked up as a regular series by CBS, with its first regular episode being shown 8 months later on September 11, 1974. Although being ranked 19th for the week that it premiered, the series was cancelled by CBS because of stiff competition from ABC's Get Christie Love! and NBC's Petrocelli with its last regular episode being shown on March 5, 1975. Reruns of the series were then shown until April.

Episodes

External links
 
 
 Television Obscurities - Fall 1974: CBS

1970s American crime drama television series
1974 American television series debuts
1975 American television series endings
American detective television series
CBS original programming
Period television series
Television series by CBS Studios
Television shows set in Idaho
English-language television shows